Aedes (Bruceharrisonius) greenii is a species complex of zoophilic mosquito belonging to the genus Aedes. It is found in Sri Lanka India, Indonesia, Malaysia, Nepal, Philippines and Thailand.

References

External links
NOTES ON THE MOSQUITOES OF NEPAL I. NEW COUNTRY RECORDS AND REVISED AEDES KEYS (DIPTERA, CULICIDAE)

greenii